Wilfred Lynn Miller (March 7, 1892 – 1985) was a politician in Ontario, Canada. He represented Algoma—Manitoulin in the Legislative Assembly of Ontario from 1934 to 1945 as a Liberal.

The son of Robert Edward Miller and Christina Jane Trevillion, he was born in Bruce Mines and was educated there. In 1919, Miller married Eva Elizabeth Hand. He was a furniture dealer, funeral director and insurance agent. Miller was also area representative for Bell Telephone. He served during World War I. Miller was one of the founding members of the local Chamber of Commerce and also served as its president. After retiring from provincial politics, he served as mayor of Bruce Mines. In 1977, Miller and his wife moved to Thessalon. He died in 1985 and is buried in Cloudslee Cemetery.

References

External links

1892 births
1985 deaths
Ontario Liberal Party MPPs
Mayors of places in Ontario